Lahtela is a Finnish surname. Notable people with the surname include:

 Olavi Lahtela (1915–1968), Finnish politician
 Seppo Lahtela (born 1947), Finnish politician
 Janne Lahtela (born 1974), Finnish athlete
 Mikko Lahtela (born 1992), Finnish ice hockey player

Finnish-language surnames